Pratima may refer to:

 Pratima (Jainism)
 Pratima (film), a 1945 Indian Hindustani-language film
 Pratima Bansal, Canadian economist